Frederick Leo Gerald Burchell (January 9, 1931 – June 4, 1998) was a Canadian professional ice hockey player born in Montreal, Quebec.

Career
Burchell began his hockey career when he played two games for the QSHL Montreal Royals. He played the next season with the NHL Montreal Canadiens. He moved on to the Eastern Hockey League to play for the Johnstown Jets where he finally found his scoring touch (37–56–93). He played for the next two seasons for the Montreal Royals again (during their league transition into a semi-pro league). He was again called up to the Canadiens and again playing two games and going pointless. He returned to the Montreal Royals before joining the Winnipeg Warriors. He began scoring more consistently as he re-joined the QHL Montreal Royals and stayed into their years when they joined the EPHL where he won that league's MVP award in 1961. He spent the next few seasons in the AHL with the Quebec Aces before playing for one final season with the EHL Jersey Devils.

Burchell coached the IHL Toledo Hornets during the 1973–74 IHL season, where he led the team to a record of 33 wins, 42 losses, and one tie.

Awards and achievements
Memorial Cup Championship (1949)
QJHL Second All-Star Team (1950, 1951)
EAHL First All-Star Team (1952)
QHL First All-Star Team (1954)
 1960–61 EPHL Most Valuable Player (shared with Cliff Pennington)

External links

1931 births
1998 deaths
Canadian ice hockey centres
Canadian ice hockey coaches
Ice hockey people from Montreal
Johnstown Jets players
Montreal Canadiens players
Quebec Aces (AHL) players
Winnipeg Warriors (minor pro) players
Canadian expatriate ice hockey players in the United States